Catecka Base Camp (also known as Catecka, Catecka Tea Plantation or The Stadium) is a former U.S. Army base southwest of Pleiku in central Vietnam.

History
The base was first established in October 1965 by the 1st Brigade, 1st Cavalry Division (Airmobile) to support the relief of the Siege of Plei Me. The base was beside QL-19 next to the Catecka Tea Plantation and approximately 12 km southwest of Pleiku. The base was originally called the Stadium but by November 1965 when it was taken over by the 3rd Brigade, 1st Cavalry (Airmobile) it was called Catecka.

Current use
The base is abandoned and is turned over to farmland. The Bàu Cạn Tea Plantation remains in operation.

References

Installations of the United States Army in South Vietnam
Buildings and structures in Gia Lai province